"Killing Me Slowly" is a song by American rock band Bad Wolves. It was their first single off of their second studio album N.A.T.I.O.N.. It topped the Billboard Mainstream Rock Songs chart in January 2020.

Background
The song was released on August 23, 2019, the same day that the band announced their second studio album would be titled N.A.T.I.O.N., making the song an instant grat download for pre-ordering the album.  It was later released as an official single on October 25, 2019, the same day as N.A.T.I.O.N. release. A music video, directed by Nick Peterson, was released the same day. In January 2020, the song topped the Billboard Mainstream Rock Songs chart for a single week. The made it the band's third song to top the chart, after their cover of The Cranberries "Zombie" and "Remember When", making three of their first four singles ending up topping the chart, a feat only done quicker by The Pretty Reckless, who had their first four singles top the chart.

Themes and composition
The song's lyrics deal with the subject of infidelity, and the aftermath that comes from it in romantic relationships. Loudwire described the song as a "pensive rock anthem" with "impassioned, soaring hooks".

Personnel
 Tommy Vext – lead vocals
 Doc Coyle – lead guitar, backing vocals
 Chris Cain – rhythm guitar
 Kyle Konkiel – bass guitar, backing vocals
 John Boecklin – drums

Charts

References

2019 songs
2019 singles
Bad Wolves songs